"A Little Bit" is a song by Swedish singer Pandora. It was released in December 1996 as the lead single from Pandora's third studio album Changes (1996). The song peaked at number 28 on the Swedish Singles Chart. It also reached number three in Finland and number ten in Australia, was certified Platinum and is her highest-charting single there.

Music video
The music video starts out in New York City, as can depicted from the yellow Chevrolet Caprice (9C6) taxi cabs, where Pandora is dressed in a blue flight attendant uniform and guides her dance crew onto a double-decker bus. While on the second deck of the bus, Pandora can be seen standing at the back of the deck and singing on a microphone attached to a stand while talking about the ups and downs of life regarding women's insecurities in life.

Track listing
"A Little Bit" was released in various formats. The major formats include:

Chart performance
"A Little Bit" peaked at number 3 in Finland and number 10 in Australia, where it remained in the top 50, for 30 weeks.

Weekly charts

Year-end charts

Certifications

References

1996 singles
1996 songs
EMI Records singles
Pandora (singer) songs
Virgin Records singles
Songs written by Patrik Magnusson